The Army & Air Force Exchange Service (AAFES, also referred to as The Exchange and The PX or The BX) is the retailer in U.S. Army and Air Force installations worldwide. The Exchange is headquartered in Dallas, Texas, and its director/chief executive officer is Tom Shull. The largest of the Department of Defense's exchange services, it is No. 54 on the National Retail Federation's Top 100 Retailers list.

In addition to their retail support for the military, the Exchange outfits troops with combat uniforms at-cost, and serves approximately 4.2 million at-cost school lunches per year for children attending Department of Defense Dependents Schools overseas.

As of Veterans Day, 11 November 2017, military exchanges started offering online exchange shopping privileges to an estimated 18 million honorably discharged veterans. The exchanges launched VetVerify.org in June 2017, allowing veterans to verify their eligibility ahead of the benefit's start date.

History

Roots

For more than 100 years before the post exchange system was created, traveling merchants known as sutlers provided American soldiers with goods and services during times of war. Sutlers served troops at Army camps as far back as the French and Indian and Revolutionary wars.

Complaints of sutlers charging premiums for substandard merchandise were widespread during the Civil War, and in 1867 the War Department created the post trader system. While intended to prevent the unscrupulous practices of sutlers, the post trader system still subjected troops to over-inflated prices and was rife with bribery and corruption.

On 29 November 1880, Col. Henry A. Morrow, seeking to quell disciplinary problems resulting from troops visiting disreputable places of amusement in nearby towns, established the first American military canteen at Vancouver Barracks. There, troops were provided newspapers and magazines, played billiards and cards, and could obtain light food and drink without leaving post.

The idea was so successful that other posts began establishing canteens across the frontier, providing troops with not only a place to socialize but obtain daily necessities at affordable prices. In 1889, the War Department issued General Orders No. 10, authorizing commanding generals to establish canteens at army posts. Like the modern-day exchange system, these canteens were largely financially self-sustaining.

In February 1892, the secretary of war ordered that canteens be henceforth referred to as "post exchanges." This change was due to the popular association of the word "canteen" with the bawdy, immoral behavior alleged to occur in the canteens of foreign armies. By 1895, post traders had been almost entirely replaced on Army posts by post exchanges.

Early developments

On 25 July 1895, the War Department issued General Orders No. 46, directing commanders at every post to establish a post exchange "wherever practicable." Post exchanges served two missions: first, "to supply the troops at reasonable prices with the articles of ordinary use, wear, and consumption, not supplied by the Government, and to afford them a means of rational recreation and amusement," and second, "provide the means for improving the masses" through exchange profits.

For the first 45 years of the exchange system, exchanges operated independently under the direction of each post’s commanding officer, meaning there was little uniformity between exchange locations. While the War Department did not centrally control exchange operations, it did hold commanding officers accountable for their financial assets. Exchanges were also subject to annual checks by the Inspector General’s office.

With the outbreak of World War I and subsequent expansion of the U.S. Army, it became clear that the existing post exchange system was not equipped to accommodate such a large-scale effort. Gen. John J. Pershing enlisted the help of civilian service organizations to provide canteen service overseas, though they proved to lack the equipment and experience necessary to fully meet the needs of downrange troops.

Centralization

During the mobilization efforts leading up to World War II, the War Department increasingly looked for ways to upgrade its antiquated post exchange system. After completing a review of existing exchanges, Lt. Col. J. Edwin Grose concluded that the Army would need to "become the operator of an extensive chain store system with world wide [sic] branches" to sufficiently meet the demands of a large-scale war effort. In April 1941, an advisory committee of five prominent retail executives affirmed this notion, recommending the creation of a central organization to oversee exchange operations.

On 6 June 1941, the Army Exchange Service (AES) was created. On 26 July 1948, AES was renamed the Army & Air Force Exchange Service, to reflect AES’ responsibility to serve the Air Force, which was created in 1947.

Since its establishment, the Exchange has been involved in 14 major military operations (to include World War II, Korea, Vietnam, Grenada, Panama, the Balkans and Operations Enduring and Iraqi Freedom) as well as several dozen humanitarian and disaster relief contingencies.

Civilian leadership

In 2012, Tom Shull became the Exchange's first civilian director/CEO, having previously served as an executive with Wise Foods, Hanover Direct, Barneys New York and Meridian Ventures. A West Point graduate, Shull served as an infantry company commander and held assignments at the White House and National Security Council.

In 2021, Shull's emphasis on merchandising national brands, expanding Express convenience stores, strengthening the Exchange's web presence and reducing costs led the Exchange to record operating earnings of US$318 million, with US$205 million of those earnings reinvested into military quality-of-life programs. The earnings improvement under Shull has occurred during fluctuations in the number of active-duty military personnel. As Exchange shopping privileges are exclusive to the military community, troop strength directly affects the size of the Exchange’s customer base.

Under Shull's leadership, the Exchange established shipping centers inside 99 brick-and-mortar stores, which reduced shipping costs and improved delivery times for customers. Shull also shaped the Exchange's efforts to bring more first-run movies to military movie theaters.

Veterans online shopping benefit

On 8 May 2012, Shull drafted a memorandum to the Under Secretary of Defense for Personnel and Readiness proposing that military exchanges be allowed to extend online shopping privileges to honorably discharged veterans.

Shull presented a business case for the veterans online shopping benefit to the Department of Defense’s Executive Resale Board in August 2014. Shull said the plan could generate more than $100 million for installation quality-of-life programs within three years. The Executive Resale Board voted unanimously to recommend the proposal in August 2016.

On 13 January 2017, the Department of Defense announced that all honorably discharged veterans would be eligible to shop tax-free online military exchanges starting 11 November 2017. The expanded benefit is made online exchange privileges available to an estimated 18 million veterans.

On 5 June 2017, military exchanges announced the launch of VetVerify.org, an online service where veterans can verify their eligibility to shop online exchanges.

As of August 2021, more than 770,000 veterans had verified their eligibility to shop online with the Exchange.

Expanded in-store shopping privileges

On 1 January 2020, the Exchange welcomed home disabled Veterans, Purple Heart recipients and certain caregivers—4.1 million Americans— with in-store shopping privileges.

Privileges expanded to all Veterans with service-connected disabilities, Veterans who are Purple Heart recipients, Veterans who are former prisoners of war and primary family caregivers for Veterans who are enrolled in the Department of Veterans Affairs Program of Comprehensive Assistance for Family Caregivers.

This new privilege was specified in the Purple Heart and Disabled Veterans Equal Access Act of 2018, included in the John S. McCain National Defense Authorization Act for Fiscal Year 2019. The Department of Defense announced the expansion 13 November 2019.

The new patron group also has access to commissaries and morale, welfare and recreation retail facilities located on U.S. military installations.

Beginning 1 May 2021, Department of Defense and Coast Guard civilians in the continental U.S. became eligible to shop at military exchanges, and online benefits were added in October 2021. Opening exchange access to DoD and Coast Guard civilian employees working on installations improves dividends to Quality-of-Life programs, leverages the military exchanges’ buying power and strengthens the Exchange benefit for Soldiers, Airmen and Guardians.

Disaster support 
Following the 9/11 terrorist attacks, the Exchange deployed Exchange stores on wheels, dubbed mobile field Exchanges (MFEs) to serve first responders at the Pentagon, World Trade Center and around New York City.  

The Exchange has a history of supporting the military responding to natural disasters. During the 2017 hurricane season, the Exchange sent support to areas affected by Hurricanes Harvey, Irma and Maria. Support included an MFE, requested by the Texas State Guard to allow National Guard members to stock up on water, batteries, beef jerky, shampoo, sports drinks and more. A second MFE opened days later in Corpus Christi, Texas.

The Exchange sent shipments of bottled water and emergency supplies such as generators, batteries, flashlights, tarps, gas cans and first-aid kits to Florida, Georgia and Puerto Rico ahead of Hurricane Irma and Hurricane Maria. 

Before Hurricane Maria made landfall, the Exchange team began funneling emergency shipments of supplies, such as generators, batteries and water, to areas in the storm’s path. Just ahead of Maria’s arrival, the Fort Buchanan main store opened 30 minutes early and sold six pallets of water in 45 minutes. As Maria’s intensity grew, an emergency list of health and personal care products, as well as pallets of bottled water, were staged throughout the Southeast for immediate shipment, with a focus on the fastest methods of transportation once the storm had passed. Just two days after the storm hit, while 90 percent of the island was still struggling with power issues, 30 associates reported to the Fort Buchanan Exchange to begin cleaning the facility to expedite opening. They were also scheduling local contractors to perform a safety inspection on the fuel pumps, which were damaged in the storm, in order to get them back up and running as soon as possible.

In the wake of Hurricane Florence and Hurricane Michael in 2018, thousands of packages of batteries, thousands of cases of water, generators, gas cans and flashlights were delivered to military installations in the path of the storms.

The Exchange deployed an MFE to Tyndall Air Force Base after Hurricane Michael to provide essentials to those assisting with recovery efforts until the base exchange reopened 28 November 2018. 

The Exchange has 13 MFEs and two mobile barber shops that can be deployed within 48 hours of command request to disaster-affected areas.

Resiliency during COVID-19 Pandemic 
During the COVID-19 pandemic, the Exchange’s No. 1 priority was to protect the military community and Exchange associates. Even before the CDC recommended face coverings or the Department of Defense mandated their wear, the Exchange distributed critical personal protective equipment to all frontline and distribution center associates.

Working in lockstep with local commands, the Exchange sought innovative solutions to continue serving the military, including personal shopper programs for quarantined troops, curbside pickup, buy online pickup in store service, MFEs and grab-and-go school meals for service members’ children overseas.

For the holiday selling season, the Exchange spread out sales events over 12 weeks to reduce crowds in its stores. This approach proved successful and positioned the Exchange as a leader in curtailing the spread of COVID-19 while continuing to serve military shoppers.

The Exchange maintained enhanced sanitization measures such as acrylic shields at points of sale; disinfecting customer service and sales points multiple times daily; signing and floor decals reminding shoppers to wear face coverings and maintain a safe distance; and keeping restaurants open for carry-out service where dine-in service was unavailable.

Exchange stores frequently host community events. During the pandemic, the Exchange pivoted to online events to allow military members and their families to remain connected to their community.

The Exchange’s first-ever Facebook live series, “Chief Chat,” brought military leaders, Hollywood A-listers, elite athletes and more straight to the military community. Guests such as Chief Master Sgt. of the Air Force JoAnne Bass, Mark Wahlberg, Matthew McConaughey, Dwayne “The Rock” Johnson, Sean “Diddy” Combs, Aaron Rodgers, Garth Brooks and more provided a welcome morale boost for the millions of military viewers who tuned in and connected with the Exchange.

Hiring Heroes 
The Exchange is a leading employer of Veterans, military spouses and family members, who make up 45% of its U.S. workforce.

Since 2013, the Exchange has hired more than 54,000 veterans and military spouses, with a goal of hiring 75,000 by 2026. The organization has also hired more than 1,900 wounded warriors since 2010.

The Exchange offers Veterans and military spouses competitive pay and benefits, including the associate transfer program, which helps military spouses continue their Exchange career as they move from duty station to duty station.

BE FIT 360 
The Exchange is partner in the Army Healthy Communities and Air Force Smarter Fueling initiatives under the Office of the Secretary of Defense, Operation Live Well.

BE FIT 360 is an Exchange initiative focused on the readiness and resiliency of military members and their families. Exchange stores feature athletic wear, shoes and gear. The Exchange identifies healthier-for-you food and beverage choices in their main store and Express locations as well as in all of the Exchange 1,600 restaurants. The Exchange offers a variety of services such as optical centers, dental offices, durable medical equipment stores and chiropractic clinics.

Structure and funding

Part of the Department of Defense, the Exchange is directed by a board of directors responsible to the secretaries of the Army and Air Force through the Chiefs of Staff. As a non-appropriated fund activity, the Exchange self-funds 98% of its operations, with revenue coming from the sale of goods and services. The majority of the 2% in appropriated funds is used to fund transporting goods overseas to Americans stationed abroad.

Members of the Exchange's 13-member board of directors include Lt. Gen. Charles R. Hamilton, Deputy Chief of Staff for Logistics of the Army Staff; Lt. Gen. Caroline M. Miller, Deputy Chief of Staff for Manpower, Personnel and Services of the U.S. Air Force; Sergeant Major of the Army Michael A. Grinston and Chief Master Sergeant of the Air Force JoAnne Bass.

Earnings

100% of Exchange earnings are invested back into the military community. Approximately 60% of Exchange earnings support military quality-of-life programs, while the remaining funds are used for new store construction and facility costs at no cost to the federal government.

In 2021, Exchange shoppers generated $205 million for installation quality-of-life programs. In the past 10 years, the Exchange has distributed more than $3.5 billion to fund quality-of-life improvements.

Stores

The Exchange operates more than 4,000 facilities, including main stores, convenience stores, military clothing stores and theaters, across 50 U.S. states and more than 30 countries. Additionally, the Exchange has more than 1,600 quick-serve restaurants such as Subway, Qdoba, Panera, Burger King, Freshens, Panda Express, Popeyes Chicken, Taco Bell, Pizza Hut, Charleys Philly Steaks and Starbucks as well as over 3,400 concession operations. Anyone can dine at Exchange restaurants.

Modern base and post exchanges (called BX in the Air Force, PX in the Army) provide tax-free goods – including name brands such as Michael Kors, Coach, and Ralph Lauren – to authorized shoppers. In addition, some Exchanges host concession malls with a variety of vendors and storefronts. Authorized patrons of the Exchange include members of Active Duty, members of the Reserves and National Guard, retired members of the U.S. uniformed services, recipients of the Medal of Honor, honorably discharged veterans certified 100% disabled by the United States Department of Veterans Affairs, or when hospitalized and their dependents by the presentation of the U.S. Uniformed Services Privilege and Identification Card.

In November 2010, the Exchange unveiled Freedom Crossing at Fort Bliss, a $100 million outdoor mall anchored by a 217,000-square-foot Exchange Main Store and including a children's play area, outdoor dining patios, shaded landscaped areas, outdoor seating, an outdoor fireplace, an interactive fountain, a lawn for community events and concerts, and more than 40 storefronts and restaurants. The mall is the first of its kind on a United States armed services base.

Employees

The Exchange employs approximately 29,000 associates worldwide in the United States, Europe, the Pacific and the Middle East. Of these, about 4,900 are military spouses, nearly 11% of the U.S. workforce is veterans and 2% is active-duty, reserves and the national guard. The Exchange has been named a Military Friendly Employer by Victory Media, publisher of G.I. Jobs and Military Spouse magazine, for eight consecutive years, receiving the publisher's Gold Award for 2019. The Exchange has made U.S. Veterans Magazine's "Best of the Best" list eight years running, as well. The Exchange has also been named a Military Friendly Spouse Employer. In all, about 85% of the Exchange's associates are connected in some way to the military.

Since 11 September 2001, 4,900 Exchange associates have deployed to combat zones in Iraq and Afghanistan to support troops in combat operations. The Exchange currently operates 300 facilities in contingency zones in countries such as Kuwait, Iraq, Saudi Arabia, Jordan, Qatar, United Arab Emirates, Romania, Cyprus, Bosnia and Kosovo.

Since 2013, the Exchange has hired more than 54,000 Veterans and military spouses and more than 1,900 Wounded Warriors since 2010.

Military Star Card

The Exchange also operates and funds the Exchange Credit Program (ECP), a program established by Congress in 1979 to protect service members from predatory lending. The Military Star Card credit card is the ECP's most successful product, with 1.6 million cardholders across the six branches and their dependents. According to an October 2016 report by CreditCards.com, the Star Card has the lowest flat interest rate among retail-branded credit cards.

Like the Exchange, the Exchange Credit Program contributes a significant portion of its earnings to morale, welfare and recreation programs. Marketed as the "one card solution" for purchases made on military installations, the card generates millions of dollars in value each year through generous terms, everyday discounts, avoided fees and special offers.

See also
Base exchange
Canex, Canadian equivalent
NAAFI, United Kingdom equivalent
Navy Exchange

References

External links 

 Official site
 The Exchange Mission, News & More

Exchange Service
Exchange Service
United States Department of Defense agencies
Retail companies of the United States
Companies based in Dallas
1895 establishments in the United States
Organizations established in 1895